Vavuniya Archaeological Museum is a regional museum located in Vavuniya town, Sri Lanka. It was founded and owned by Department of Archaeology of Sri Lanka. This regional museum covers and exhibits archaeological objects that found in Vavuniya area and its surroundings.

The museum has fifth to eighth centuries antiques, statues of Buddha, statues of Hindu goddess and a few Christian object such as baptismal font.

Opening hours 
The museum is open from 8.30 AM to 5.00 PM and close on Tuesday and on public holidays. The entrance fee is free. Photography is prohibited unless permission is obtained.

See also 
 List of museums in Sri Lanka

References 

Cultural buildings in Vavuniya
Museums in Vavuniya District